Erin Belieu (born September 25, 1965) is an American poet.

Early life
Belieu was born and raised in Omaha, Nebraska, graduating from Central High School. She received her Bachelor of Fine Arts at the University of Nebraska-Omaha, where she learned how to construct poetry. Belieu then attended Boston University, and Ohio State University receiving advanced degrees in the area of poetry.

Career
Belieu previously taught at Washington University in St. Louis, Boston University, Kenyon College, Ohio University, and Florida State University. She is presently on faculty at the University of Houston MFA/Ph.D. Creative Writing Program.

Her work has appeared in places such as The New Yorker, The Atlantic Monthly, Slate, Nerve, The Yale Review, TriQuarterly, Ploughshares, The New York Times, Tin House, and The Virginia Quarterly Review. Her poetry collections include Infanta, One Above & One Below, Black Box and Slant Six.  She has served as managing editor of AGNI.

In September 2006, Belieu was invited to join the Wave Press Poetry Bus Tour, along with notable poets such as Matthew Zapruder, Joshua Beckman, Eileen Myles and Arthur Sze.

In August 2009, Belieu cofounded the national feminist organization VIDA: Women In Literary Arts, notable for its influential annual survey of the rates of publication between male and female authors. This VIDA survey, known as The Count, has been highly influential in addressing sweeping gender bias in contemporary American literary publishing. Belieu formerly served as VIDA's co director, along with notable American poet Cate Marvin.

In August 2015, Belieu was one of 20 authors of Poets for Corbyn, an anthology of poems endorsing Jeremy Corbyn's the campaign in Labour Party leadership election.

Awards and honors
 1994 National Poetry Series, for Infanta, selected by Hayden Carruth
 1995 Rona Jaffe Foundation Writers' Award
 Ohioana Award
 Society of Midland Authors Award
invited to read at the Library of Congress by former Poet Laureate Robert Pinsky
2007 finalist for the Los Angeles Times book award in poetry for Black Box

Bibliography

Collections

List of poems
"For Catherine: Juana, Infanta of Navarre", AGNI 56, 2002
"The Last Of The Gentlemen Heartbreakers"; "In Ecstasy"; "Of The Poet’s Youth", Reading Between A&B, Fall 2007
"Two Weeks On The Island", electronic poetry review
"The Birthmark", Ploughshares, Spring 2003

Anthologies
The Best American Poetry, 2011 editors Kevin Young, David Lehman

As editor

References

External links
"Erin Belieu", Web Del Sol
"Erin Belieu Does the Poetry Bus and Other Associated Necrophilia", eclectica, Gilbert Wesley Purdy
"Erin Belieu", How a Poem Happens, July 13, 2009

1967 births
Living people
20th-century American poets
20th-century American women writers
21st-century American poets
21st-century American women writers
American women poets
Boston University alumni
Boston University faculty
Florida State University faculty
Kenyon College faculty
Ohio State University Graduate School alumni
Ohio University faculty
Poets from Nebraska
Rona Jaffe Foundation Writers' Award winners
The New Yorker people
Washington University in St. Louis faculty
Writers from Omaha, Nebraska
Omaha Central High School alumni